Drew Henry (born 24 November 1968) is a Scottish former professional snooker player, who spent five consecutive seasons of his career in the top 32 of the rankings, peaking at No. 18.

Career
A strong amateur, Henry won the 1988 Scottish Amateur Championship and reached the Semi-Finals of the World Amateur Championship in the same year.

Turning professional in 1991, Henry had a terrific start to his career, winning 51 of his first 62 career matches and rose to a ranking position of 39 within three seasons.

Spending 13 consecutive seasons within the World's top 48 players, Henry enjoyed his best form around the turn of the century, reaching three ranking event semi-finals, including the 2002 UK Championship, where he defeated Ronnie O'Sullivan 9-6 in the Quarter-Final.

Henry achieved his best ranking of 18 for the 2001/2002 season, having narrowly missed a top 16 spot at the end of the season. He enjoyed five consecutive seasons within the World's top 32 players.

Henry was also victorious in the 1991 Pontins Professional, defeating John Read in the final and won the 1995 WPBSA Minor Tour Event 6 in Beijing, defeating Mark Williams 6-5. In 2002 Henry also defeated Ali Carter 5-3 to win the Scottish Masters Qualifying Event. In 1996 Henry narrowly missed out on a place in the Masters when he lost in a deciding frame 8-9 to Brian Morgan in the Final of the Benson & Hedges Championship. He also lost to Dominic Dale in the final of the Malaysian Masters in the same year.

One of Scotland's leading players through the 1990s and 2000s, Henry also appeared at the Crucible Theatre for the World Snooker Championships on six occasions, losing a number of close matches to leading players such as Mark Williams, Ronnie O'Sullivan, Stephen Hendry and John Parrott. He made his debut at the crucible in 1994 losing 9-10 to John Parrott and his final appearance in 2005 losing by the same scoreline to Alan McManus, with his best runs being to the last 16 in 2000 and 2003.

After 17 seasons as a pro, Henry lost his professional status in 2008 after dropping out of the World's top 64 players  following a poor run of results. Henry completely retired from the game and has since made no attempt to regain his professional status.

Career finals

Non-ranking finals: 4 (2 titles)

Pro-am finals: 2 (1 title)

Amateur Finals: 1 (1 title)

References

1968 births
Living people
Scottish snooker players
Sportspeople from Cambuslang